Fred O'Brien (born 1938) is an Irish retired hurler who played for club side Mount Sion and at inter-county level with the Waterford senior hurling team.

Honours

Waterford
All-Ireland Senior Hurling Championship (1): 1959
Munster Senior Hurling Championship (1): 1959

References

1938 births
Living people
Mount Sion hurlers
Waterford inter-county hurlers